"Into The New World" is the debut single by South Korean girl group Girls' Generation. It was composed by Kenzie and written by Kim Jeong-bae. It was released on August 3, 2007, by SM Entertainment and distributed by Genie Music, and on August 6 as a physical copy. It was later included on Girls' Generation's debut album (2007).

Although "Into the New World" was met with only moderate success in South Korea upon its initial release, music critics have since noted it as an iconic song that "represents solidarity" and an anthem associated with South Korean protest culture. The group has performed "Into The New World" in a number of live performances on music programs and in all of their Asian concert tours, including the Into the New World Asia Tour (2009), First Japan Arena Tour (2011), Girls' Generation Tour (2011) and Girls & Peace World Tour (2013); the group also performed the song as a ballad version during their Phantasia Tour (2015).

Background and release
In 2002, the song was considered as a candidate for M.I.L.K.'s second album. Due to the group's breakup in 2003, the song was shelved until Girls' Generation's debut. "Into the New World" was officially released as part of a single album on August 3, 2007. The song was originally first performed by the group in SBS's Inkigayo on August 5, 2007. "Into the New World" reached number one on Mnet's M Countdown on October 11, 2007.

Commercial performance 
Upon its initial release, "Into the New World" experienced only moderate levels of success in South Korea. The physical edition of "Into the New World" debuted at number 5 on the monthly album chart for August 2007 compiled by the Music Industry Association of Korea (MIAK), selling 10,823 copies in its first month of release. It was the 41st best-selling CD release of 2007 in South Korea, selling 22,818 physical copies in total. In 2010, the single peaked at number 2 on the Gaon Album Chart for the chart issue dated April 18–24, based on physical sales. It ranked at number 9 on the Gaon monthly chart issue for April 2010.

Music video
The music video was filmed from July 21 to 23, 2007, at Paju Book City, Provence Village, Yeoju Promotion Flight School, and Yangjae-dong. The music video was directed by Cheon Hyuk-jin and shows the group members doing various activities. Yoona is designing clothes for a boutique, Taeyeon is flying a light aircraft with Sooyoung accompanying her. In the video, the aircraft Taeyeon flies is broken, and she attempts to repair it, with Sooyoung praying. The aircraft is successfully repaired and both of them are happy. In the last scene of the video, Sooyoung is seen chasing after Taeyeon as she flies away in the aircraft.

Yuri is a barista in the music video and is seen making a latte. Hyoyeon is purchasing a pair of white training shoes at a department store, after which she dances on a stairway. Sunny and Jessica are seen spray painting the worlds "New World 2007". Tiffany is repairing a scooter (specifically, a Yamaha Fino 115) and repaints its body with pink color with flower motif and customizes its license plate. The customized license plate says "Tiffany" with the hanja version of "Girls' Generation" above it. It is actually owned by Shindong of Super Junior. Seohyun is doing ballet while holding a paper plane, on the rooftop of a building.

There are two dance settings featured in the video. The first one is a room with a white background, and the second one is a lobby of a shopping mall. The music video on SM Town's YouTube channel, originally uploaded on June 3, 2011, was remastered in high definition and in 4K and was re-released on January 21, 2022, as part of SM's Remastering Project.

In popular culture 
This song is often covered in survival shows, special stages of music charts and award shows. In the first season of Produce 101, it was used as one of the debut song missions, it was also used for the first evaluation in Finding Momoland. Big Mama's Lee Young-Hyun performed a reinterpretation of the song on Immortal Songs - King of Kings annual special feature. At the 2016 Gaon Chart Music Awards, GFriend, I.O.I, Twice and Red Velvet covered the song. In Idol School in 2017, it was used as a preliminary vocal assessment. The nine winners from the show, Fromis 9, performed the song again for M! Countdown's 600th episode.

After member Jessica left Girls' Generation, the song was also changed into a ballad version for live concert performances. Hyoyeon also admitted on Secret Unnies that the choreography was prepared as far back as a year before Girls' Generation official debut. The ballad version of the song was used as a diagnostics tool in Produce 48. In that cover, Kim Chae-won and Nako Yabuki went on to become members of Iz*One.

Legacy 
The song experienced a resurgence in 2016 when Ewha Womans University students sang it during part of their peaceful protest against the university whilst facing 1600 police officers. Girls' Generation member Tiffany responded that

Fellow member Yuri also expressed similar sentiments:

During the 2016–2017 South Korean protests, the song, along with Big Bang's "Bang Bang Bang" (2015) and Twice's "Cheer Up" (2016), was sung widely in public squares, leading to it becoming the "morning dew" of the young generation and led to it placing number one on Melon's real-time charts almost ten years after its release. It was also sung in celebration when judges of the Constitutional Court of Korea ruled against the criminalization of abortion in South Korea on April 11, 2019. In 2020, it was used during an anti-government rally as part of the 2020 Thai protests. Some protesters were already aware of the song's usage during protests in Korea. K-pop fans helped translate and memorize meaningful lyrics for protesters to sing along. 

In a panel of 35 music critics and professionals organized by newspaper Seoul Shinmun and online portal Melon, "Into the New World" was ranked the 6th best K-pop song of all time; music critic Squib said that it has continuously attracted the attention of the public and has become a "symbol of the times". The Korea Herald also highlighted the song's use in expressing solidarity for a cause, noting that the song's lyrics about unity resonated with Korean millennials. Naming it one of the best K-pop debut songs of all time, Insider wrote "in the 15 years since its release, has become a standard for Korean girl groups".

Track listing

Credits and personnel 
Credits adapted from album's liner notes.

Studio 
 Recorded at SM Blue Ocean Studio, SM Yellow Tail Studio, SM Concert Hall Studio
 Mixed and digitally edited at SM Concert Hall Studio
 Mastered at Sonic Korea

Personnel 

 SM Entertainment – executive producer
 Lee Soo-man – producer
 Girls' Generation – vocals, background vocals 
 Kenzie – composition , arrangement , vocal directing 
 Kim Jeong-bae – lyrics , guitar 
 Anna-Lena Margaretha Hogdahl – composition 
 Mattias Lindblom – composition 
 Anders Wollbeck – composition 
 Yoon Hyo-sang – lyrics 
 Hwang Sung-je – arrangement, recording, vocal directing 
 Lee Jae-myung – guitar 
 Kwon Yun-jeong – lyrics 
 Ingrid Skretting – composition 
 Kim Hyun-ah – background vocals 
 Choi Won-seok – bass 
 Heo Jeong-hee  KAT – recording 
 Lee Seong-ho – recording 
 Nam Koong-jin – recording, mixing, digital editing 
 Jeon Hoon – mastering

Chart performance

Weekly charts

Monthly charts

Sales

Accolades

Release history

References

2007 debut singles
Girls' Generation songs
SM Entertainment singles
Korean-language songs
Songs written by Kenzie (songwriter)
Dance-pop songs
2007 songs
Protest songs